Yuli Yakovlevich Raizman (December 15, 1903 – December 11, 1994) was a Soviet Russian film director and screenwriter.

Career
In 1924 he became a literary consultant for Mezhrabpom-Rus, the German-Russian film studio.  He was assigned as assistant to Yakov Protazanov in 1925 and made his directorial debut in 1927 with The Circle, first drawing attention the following year with Penal Servitude. His next success was The Earth Thirsts in 1930, the Soviet Union's first sound film.

He joined Mosfilm in 1931 and in 1937 he won his first Stalin Prize (of the Second degree) for The Last Night, which was also his first collaboration with the writer Yevgeny Gabrilovich with whom he worked for the next 40 years. The film also achieved international recognition winning the Grand Prix at the Paris International Exhibition of 1937.

In 1942 Mashenka was a success also earning a Stalin Prize of the Second degree.

He made a couple of war documentaries, Fall of Berlin - 1945 and Towards an Armistice with Finland both of which won the Stalin Prize of the First degree.

Rainis (1949) won another Stalin Prize (second degree).

Cavalier of the Golden Star, also known as Dream of a Cossack, won the top prize at the 1951 Karlovy Vary International Film Festival and also competed for the Grand Prix at the 1951 Cannes Film Festival.  It also won the Stalin Prize of the First degree.

The Communist marked the fortieth anniversary of the October Revolution and a follow-up, Your Contemporary, appeared in 1968.

In 1964, he was made People's Artist of the USSR and Hero of Socialist Labor, the highest civilian decoration in the Soviet Union, in 1973.

His film Private Life (1982) won the USSR State Prize and was nominated for the Academy Award for Best Foreign Language Film.

His 7 Stalin/State Prizes made him one of the most decorated cultural figures in the Soviet Union. He was the first person to receive the Honor and Dignity Award for lifetime achievement at the Nika Awards in 1988 presented by the Russian Academy of Cinema Arts and Science.

Personal life
He was married to Suzanna Ter, who died in 1991.

Selected filmography
 The Circle (1927)
 Penal Servitude (1928)
 The Earth Is Thirsty  (1930)
 The Pilots  (1935)
 The Last Night (1936)
 Virgin Soil Upturned (1939)
 Mashenka (1942)
 Moscow Skies (1944)
 Fall of Berlin - 1945 (1945)
 The Train Goes East (1947)
 Rainis (1949)
 Dream of a Cossack (1951)
 Conflict (Urok Zhizhni) (1955)
 The Communist (1958)
 But What If This Is Love (1961)
 Your Contemporary (1967)
 A Strange Woman (1977)
 Private Life (1982)
 Time of Desires'' (1984)

References

External links

 Yuli Raizman Obituary  from The Independent

Soviet film directors
Soviet screenwriters
Male screenwriters
1903 births
1994 deaths
People's Artists of the USSR
Moscow State University alumni
Recipients of the USSR State Prize
Recipients of the Order of Lenin
Recipients of the Order of Friendship of Peoples
Recipients of the Nika Award
Academic staff of the Gerasimov Institute of Cinematography
Academic staff of High Courses for Scriptwriters and Film Directors
Stalin Prize winners
Burials in Troyekurovskoye Cemetery
Soviet Jews
Russian Jews